{{DISPLAYTITLE:A4 polytope}}

In 4-dimensional geometry, there are 9 uniform polytopes with A4 symmetry. There is one self-dual regular form, the 5-cell with 5 vertices.

Symmetry
A4 symmetry, or [3,3,3] is order 120, with Conway quaternion notation +1/60[I×].21. Its abstract structure is the symmetric group S5.  Three forms with symmetric Coxeter diagrams have extended symmetry, [[3,3,3]] of order 240, and Conway notation ±1/60[I×].2, and abstract structure S5×C2.

Visualizations
Each can be visualized as symmetric orthographic projections in Coxeter planes of the A4 Coxeter group, and other subgroups. Three Coxeter plane 2D projections are given, for the A4, A3, A2 Coxeter groups, showing symmetry order 5,4,3, and doubled on even Ak orders to 10,4,6 for symmetric Coxeter diagrams.

The 3D picture are drawn as Schlegel diagram projections, centered on the cell at pos. 3, with a consistent orientation, and the 5 cells at position 0 are shown solid.

Coordinates 

The coordinates of uniform 4-polytopes with pentachoric symmetry can be generated as permutations of simple integers in 5-space, all in hyperplanes with normal vector (1,1,1,1,1). The A4 Coxeter group is palindromic, so repeated polytopes exist in pairs of dual configurations. There are 3 symmetric positions, and 6 pairs making the total 15 permutations of one or more rings. All 15 are listed here in order of binary arithmetic for clarity of the coordinate generation from the rings in each corresponding Coxeter diagram.

The number of vertices can be deduced here from the permutations of the number of coordinates, peaking at 5 factorial for the omnitruncated form with 5 unique coordinate values.

References

 J.H. Conway and M.J.T. Guy: Four-Dimensional Archimedean Polytopes, Proceedings of the Colloquium on Convexity at Copenhagen, page 38 und 39, 1965 
 John H. Conway, Heidi Burgiel, Chaim Goodman-Strauss, The Symmetries of Things 2008,  (Chapter 26)
 H.S.M. Coxeter:
 H.S.M. Coxeter, Regular Polytopes, 3rd Edition, Dover New York, 1973
 Kaleidoscopes: Selected Writings of H.S.M. Coxeter, edited by F. Arthur Sherk, Peter McMullen, Anthony C. Thompson, Asia Ivic Weiss, Wiley-Interscience Publication, 1995,  Wiley::Kaleidoscopes: Selected Writings of H.S.M. Coxeter
 (Paper 22) H.S.M. Coxeter, Regular and Semi Regular Polytopes I, [Math. Zeit. 46 (1940) 380–407, MR 2,10]
 (Paper 23) H.S.M. Coxeter, Regular and Semi-Regular Polytopes II, [Math. Zeit. 188 (1985) 559-591]
 (Paper 24) H.S.M. Coxeter, Regular and Semi-Regular Polytopes III, [Math. Zeit. 200 (1988) 3-45]
 N.W. Johnson: The Theory of Uniform Polytopes and Honeycombs, Ph.D. Dissertation, University of Toronto, 1966

External links
 
 Uniform, convex polytopes in four dimensions:, Marco Möller  
 

 

4-polytopes